Isidoro Montes de Oca (1789–1847) was a Mexican of Spanish Filipino descent who was a revolutionary general who fought in the Mexican War of Independence between 1810 and 1821. He was among the commanders of the army of Vicente Guerrero and José María Morelos. And was a trusted man of Vicente Guerrero and was his sub-General.

Originating from the Rancho de La Alhaja, in the current municipality of La Unión. He attended many war actions under the command of Morelos and Guerrero. He was head of the escort of Generalissimo Morelos called the 50 pairs. The main battle action where he stood out was that of the Treasury of Tamo, in Michoacán on September 15, 1818, in which the opposing forces numbered four times greater, they were totally destroyed. On the death of Don José María Morelos, on December 22, 1815, few insurgents remain fighting the royalists. The majority were pardoned but Vicente Guerrero continued fighting in the mountains of the south, who in the hacienda of Tamo (of the State of Michoacán today), together with Don Isidro Montes de Oca and with few and poorly armed insurgents, inflicted a real defeat on the royalist José Gabriel de Armijo and they also got enough equipment to properly arm 1,800 soldiers of freedom who in the future will deserve the respect of Agustín de Iturbide.

He stood out for his courage in the siege of the Port of Acapulco in 1813, under the orders of General José María Morelos y Pavón. As well as in the Cuautla Site. He was present in the historical deed called Acatempan's embrace, between Iturbide and Vicente Guerrero. Near the end of the war he reached the rank of captain general. After the end of the Mexican war of independence, he obtained some positions in the government of the republic; standing out as senator of the State of Sonora. Later retiring of the public life and taking refuge in the town of Petatlán, Guerrero; where he dedicated himself to the administration of his property, as well as to the activities of cattle raising and agriculture. He spent his last days of life in that place, his remains are in the parish of Petatlán in whose town he died at the age of 58. At the death of Vicente Guerrero, Juan Álvarez was the political heir. Álvarez began to direct the followers of President Vicente Guerrero sacrificed in 1831. Other minor caciques and military leaders, including General Isidro Montes de Oca, joined around Álvarez.

According to Ricardo Pinzon, two Filipino soldiers — Francisco Mongoy and Isidoro Montes de Oca — were so distinguished in battle that they are regarded as folk heroes in Mexico. General Vicente Guerrero later became the first president of Mexico of African descent. 

Around the 1930s, the municipality La Unión Guerrero adopted its current name, La Unión de Isidoro Montes de Oca, in honor of the insurgent captain. His remains rest in the municipal pantheon of Petatlán, Guerrero.

References

 Delgado de Cantú, Gloria M. (2006). Historia de México. México, D. F.: Pearson Educación. .
 González Davíla Amado. Geografía del Estado de Guerrero y síntesis histórica 1959. México D.F.; ed. Quetzalcóatl.revealed in modern DNA By Lizzie Wade)

People of the Mexican War of Independence
Military personnel from Guerrero
Mexican generals
Mexican people of Filipino descent
1789 births
1847 deaths